The 1979 Nebraska Cornhuskers football team represented the University of Nebraska–Lincoln in the 1979 NCAA Division I-A football season. The team was coached by Tom Osborne and played their home games in Memorial Stadium in Lincoln, Nebraska.

Schedule

Roster

Depth chart

Coaching staff

Game summaries

Utah State

Nebraska started out the 1979 season with less than convincing power, as relatively unheralded Utah State was still in the game as the teams entered intermission tied at 14.  After adjustments were made, coaching and conditioning put the distance between the two teams as the Aggies failed to score again while the Cornhuskers added 21 with the help of 455 yards on the ground for the day.

Iowa

For the second week in a row, an unranked team came out strong against Nebraska, as Iowa scored first and held Nebraska to the 7-7 tie at the half.  The situation wasn't looking up for the Cornhuskers as Iowa moved ahead to 21-14 by the end of the 3rd, but finally the Blackshirts put the brakes on Iowa's offensive output and eventually forced a fumble as the 4th quarter wound down which Nebraska successfully converted into the winning field goal before the Cornhuskers escaped Iowa City with the win.

Penn State

Nebraska continued their season trend of posting weak starts, as Penn State surged to a 14-point lead in the 1st quarter, but the Blackshirts seemed to figure out the Nittany Lions from that point forward, allowing only a 3rd-quarter field goal, while the Cornhusker offense came to life and put up 42 points to pass by Penn State and quell any hopes of an upset in Lincoln.

New Mexico State

This game was all Nebraska, as IB Jarvis Redwine made his first start and racked up 120 yards in just 16 carries, leaving the game before halftime.  Eighty four Cornhuskers saw playing time, including some true freshmen, as Nebraska coasted to an easy 57-0 pasting of the Aggies.

Kansas

Nebraska again dominated, although the Kansas defense prevented three of four touchdown attempts in the first half and forced the Cornhuskers to settle for field goals instead.  This was little help for the Jayhawks, however, who could not muster any kind of response to get onto the scoreboard.  By the end of the game, Kansas had acquired only 8 first downs, 79 total yards, and suffered 3 interceptions as Nebraska's 611 offensive yards allowed them to steamroll to a 42-0 shutout victory.

Oklahoma State

Nebraska settled into a remarkable groove, posting their 3rd straight shutout victory on the road in Stillwater.  Two Nebraska runners exceeded 100 yards as the Cornhuskers rolled up 433 yards on the ground compared to only 37 by the Cowboys, who only crossed midfield twice.

Colorado

Colorado's only touchdown came on an interception return, which left intact a record 19 straight quarters that the Blackshirts had prevented a touchdown, while IB Jarvis Redwine amassed over 200 yards and three touchdowns as the Cornhuskers defeated the Buffaloes for the 12th consecutive time.

Missouri

Nebraska pulled out to an early 20-6 lead shortly after halftime, and a relatively easy win seemed to be on the horizon, but someone forgot to tell Missouri to give up.  The Tigers came right back, scoring 14 straight to tie the game at 20 as the 3rd quarter ended, and the game was on.  Both teams struggled to make progress until Nebraska was able to muster a single field goal with a little over 3 minutes left to play, but the game was not decided until the final play, as Missouri opted out of the easy, game-tying field goal and went for the win from the Nebraska 11 with 3 seconds left, only for QB Phil Bradley to get sacked by the Blackshirts before he could unload the ball.

Kansas State

Kansas State turned over four interceptions, but it seemed as if Nebraska was intent on repaying the favor by losing five of seven fumbles to help keep the Wildcats in the game.  By the beginning of the 4th quarter, the Wildcats trailed the Cornhuskers by just 2 points.  Halfway through the 4th, Nebraska put up 7 more points to create some breathing room, and held off Kansas State until time expired.

Iowa State

Nebraska experienced yet another slow start as the 1st quarter ended with only a Cornhusker field goal on the board, but in the second quarter things seemed to fall into place as Nebraska posted another 25 points by halftime without any response from Iowa State.  The Cyclones managed to avoid the shutout with a field goal in the 4th, but avoiding the disgrace of the shutout was about all they accomplished for the day as they departed Lincoln with a 3-34 loss on the books.

Oklahoma

A hard fought battle for the Big 8 title resulted in disappointment for Nebraska, who surrendered a 4-point halftime lead as Oklahoma overpowered the Blackshirts, who had been ranked #1 against the run leading up to this game.  The final score of the day came from Nebraska's second-ever fumblerooski, picked up by All-American guard Randy Schleusener.

Houston

The Cornhuskers got onto the scoreboard first with a 1st-quarter touchdown, but offensive production stalled as Houston caught up and tied the Cornhuskers before halftime.  The Cougers gave up an interception and lost three of seven fumbles during the game, giving Nebraska a 4-1 turnover margin edge, but Houston's passing and rushing efforts were successful enough to overcome the setbacks.  Nebraska gained a slim 3-point lead with little more than 3 minutes to play, but Houston marched down the field and put one more touchdown into the end zone with just 12 seconds on the clock, handing Nebraska a loss to close the season.

Rankings

Awards

NFL and Pro Players
The following Nebraska players who participated in the 1979 season later moved on to the next level and joined a professional or semi-pro team as draftees or free agents.

References

Nebraska
Nebraska Cornhuskers football seasons
Nebraska Cornhuskers football